Daniel Humair (born 23 May 1938 in Geneva, Switzerland) is a Swiss drummer, composer, and painter.

He is widely renowned and became a Chevalier of the Ordre des Arts et des Lettres in 1986 and Officier in 1992. He has played with many jazz performers notably Phil Woods, Jean-Luc Ponty, Chet Baker, Michel Portal, Martial Solal, Dexter Gordon, Gerry Mulligan, Rahsaan Roland Kirk and Eric Dolphy.

Humair is also a talented painter. He describes his own work as "figurative abstract" and has created a coherent œuvre proving his passion and knowledge of artistic painting.

Discography

As leader
 Hum! with Rene Urtreger, Pierre Michelot (Vega, 1960)
 Trio HLP (CBS, 1968)
 Drumo Vocalo (International Music Label, 1971)
 Our Kind of Sabi with Eddy Louiss, John Surman (MPS/BASF, 1970)
 Beck Mathewson Humair Trio (Dire, 1972)
 La Sorcellerie a Travers Les Ages with Jean Luc Ponty, Phil Woods, Eddy Louiss (1977)
 Suite for Trio with Martial Solal, Niels-Henning Ørsted Pedersen (MPS 1978)
 Urtreger Michelot Humair with Rene Urtreger, Pierre Michelot (Carlyne Music, 1979)
 Humair Jeanneau Texier (Owl, 1979)
 Triple Hip Trip (Owl, 1979)
 Apocalypse with Jean-Charles Capon (Magicabus, 1980)
 East Side West Side (Owl, 1981)
 Akagera with Jeanneau/Texier (JMS, 1980)
 Scratch with Kenny Barron, Dave Holland (Enja, 1985)
 Pepites with Andre Jaume (CELP, 1987)
 9–11 p.m. Town Hall with Michel Portal (Label Bleu, 1988)
 Quatre with Rava/D'Andrea/Vitous (Gala, 1989)
 Up Date 3.3 with Francois Jeanneau, Henri Texier (Label Bleu, 1990)
 Edges (Label Bleu, 1991)
 Earthcake with Quatre (Gala, 1991)
 Vol. 1 with Louiss/Ponty (Dreyfus, 1991)
 Vol. 2 with Louiss/Ponty (Dreyfus, 1991)
 Solo Print with Roland Auzet (Iris Musique, 1997)
 Quatre Fois Trois (Label Bleu, 1998)
 HUM (Humair Urteger Michelot) (Sketch, 1999)
 Borderlines with Farao/Avenel (Sketch, 2000)
 Liberte Surveillee (Sketch, 2001)
 Frontier Traffic with Charlie Mariano (Konnex, 2002)
 Work with Steve Lacy (Sketch, 2002)
 Baby Boom (Sketch, 2003)
 Ear Mix with Stamm/Friedman/Boisseau (Sketch, 2003)
 Tryptic with Celea/Couturier (Bee Jazz, 2007)
 Bonus Boom (Bee Jazz, 2008)
 Full Contact with Joachim Kuhn (Bee Jazz, 2008)
 Pas de Dense with Tony Malaby (Zig Zag, 2010)
 Jazz Festival, Kulturzentrum Kammgarn Schaffhausen, Switzerland (UWM, 2011)
 Sweet & Sour (Laborie, 2012)
 Lights with Nicolas Former (Cristal, 2012)
 Seasoning (Intuition, 2017)
 Modern Art (INC/SES, 2017)

As sideman
With Franco Ambrosetti
 Jazz a Confronto 11 (Horo, 1974)
 Steppenwolf (PDU, 1975)
 Franco Ambrosetti Quartet (PDU, 1976)
 Wings (Enja, 1984)
 Tentets (Enja, 1985)
 Movies (Enja, 1987)
 Movies Too (Enja, 1988)
 European Legacy (Enja, 2003)
 Liquid Gardens (Enja, 2006)

With European Jazz Ensemble
 20th Anniversary Tour (Konnex, 1997)
 25th Anniversary (Konnex, 2002)
 30th Anniversary Tour 2006 (Konnex, 2009)

With Stephane Grappelli
 Just One of Those Things! (Black Lion 1973)
 Les Grands Classiques Du Jazz (Festival, 1973)
 Les Valseuses (Festival, 1974)
 Django (Barclay, 1976)
 Stephane Grappelli with Bill Coleman (Classic Jazz, 1976)
 Giants (MPS 1981)
 Feeling + Finesse = Jazz (Atlantic, 1984)
 Anything Goes (CBS, 1989)
 Stephane Grappelli Plays Cole Porter (Gitanes, 2001)
 Stephane Grappelli Plays George Gershwin (Festival)

With George Gruntz
 Jazz Goes Baroque 2 (Philips, 1965)
 Drums and Folklore (SABA, 1967)
 Noon in Tunisia (SABA, 1967)
 St. Peter Power (MPS, 1968)
 Monster Sticksland Meeting Two Monster Jazz (MPS 1974)
 For Flying Out Proud (MPS, 1978)

With Raymond Guiot
 Jazz Baroque Quintet (Tele Music, 1970)
 Joue Domenico Scarlatti (Decca, 1970)
 Haendel with Care (Musidisc, 1973)

With Joachim Kuhn & J.F. Jenny-Clark
 Easy to Read (Owl, 1985)
 From Time to Time (CMP, 1988)
 Live Theatre De La Ville Paris 1989 (CMP, 1990)
 Carambolage (CMP, 1992)
 Usual Confusion (Label Bleu, 1993)
 Triple Entente (EmArcy, 1998)

With Claude Nougaro
 No. 2 (Philips, 1963)
 Claude Nougaro (Philips, 1966)
 Paris Mai (Philips, 1969)
 Le Disque D'Or De Claude Nougaro (Philips, 1972)
 Les Grandes Chansons De Claude Nougaro Une Petite Fille (Philips, 1972)

With Jean-Luc Ponty
 Jazz Long Playing (Philips, 1964)
 Sunday Walk (SABA, 1967)
 More Than Meets the Ear (Pacific Jazz, 1968)

With Michel Portal
 Any Way (Label Bleu, 1993)
 L'ombre Rouge (Saravah, 1981)
 Turbulence (Harmonia Mundi, 1987)

With Rhoda Scott
 A L'Orgue Hammond Take a Ladder (RSB, 1969)
 A L'Orgue Hammond Vol. 2 (Barclay, 1970)
 Rhoda Scott (Budapesten Pepita 1975)

With Martial Solal
 Martial Solal (Columbia, 1960)
 Jazz a Gaveau (Columbia, 1962)
 Concert a Gaveau Vol. 2 (Columbia, 1964)
 Solal! (Milestone, 1967)
 Contrastes (Storyville, 1999)
 A Bout de Souffle (EmArcy, 2002)

With Swingle Singers
 Anyone for Mozart? (Philips, 1964)
 Les Romantiques (Philips, 1965)
 Rococo a Go Go (Philips, 1966)
 Concerto D'Aranjuez Sounds of Spain (Philips, 1967)
 J. S. Bach (Philips, 1968)
 The Swingle Singers Meet the Modern Jazz Quartet (Philips, 1968)
 Jazz Sebastian Bach Vol. 2 (Philips, 1968)
 Christmastime (EmArcy, 1968)

With Barney Wilen
 Barney (RCA, 1960)
 More from Barney at the Club Saint-Germain (RCA Victor, 1997)
 Le Jardin Aux Sentiers Qui Bifurquent (CELP, 2004)

With Phil Woods
 Alive and Well in Paris (Pathe, 1968)
 At the Montreux Jazz Festival (MGM, 1970)
 Phil Woods and His European Rhythm Machine (Pierre Cardin, 1970)
 Live at Montreux 72 (Pierre Cardin, 1972)
 Woods-Notes (Joker, 1977)
 The Birth of the ERM the Ljubljana and Bologna Concerts (Philology, 1990)
 A Jazz Life (Philology, 1992)

With Attila Zoller
 The Horizon Beyond (EmArcy, 1965)
Memories of Pannonia (Enja, 1986)
 Overcome Live at the Leverkusen Jazz Festival (Enja, 1988)

With others

 Kenny Barron and Dave Holland, Scratch (Enja, 1985)

 Flavio Ambrosetti, Jazz Stars (Dire, 1968)
 Franck Amsallem, Years Gone By (A Records, 1998)
 Maurice Andre & Claude Bolling, Toot Suite (CBS, 1981)
 Georges Arvanitas, Soul Jazz (Columbia, 1960)
 Georges Arvanitas, Pianos Puzzle (Saravah, 1970)
 Marcel Azzola, Pieces Pour Claviers (Mazo 1983)
 Chet Baker, Chet Is Back! (RCA Victor, 1962)
 Mickey Baker, Mickey Baker Plays Mickey Baker (Versailles, 1962)
 Elek Bacsik, The Electric Guitar of the Eclectic Elek Bacsik (Fontana, 1962)
 Elek Bacsik, Guitar Conceptions (Fontana, 1963)
 The Band, The Alpine Power Plant (MPS/BASF, 1972)
The Band, Live at the Schauspielhaus (MPS 1976)
 Gordon Beck, All in the Morning (Art of Life, 1973)
 Lou Bennett, Dansez Et Revez (Phono, 2017)
 Jerry Bergonzi, Peek a Boo (Evidence, 1993)
 Jane Birkin, Versions Jane (Philips, 1996)
 Samuel Blaser, 1291 (OutNote Records, 2020)
 Gary Burton, Live in Cannes (Jazz World, 1995)
 Gary Burton, No More Blues (Magnum Music, 2000)
 Eugen Cicero, Mr. Golden Hands Vol. 1 (Intercord, 1976)
 Marius Constant & Martial Solal, Stress Psyche Trois Complexes (Erato, 1981)
 Bill Coleman, Mainstream at Montreux (Black Lion 1973)
 Alan Davie, Phantom in the Room (ADMW, 1971)
 Georges Delerue, Calmos (Black and Blue, 1975)
 Eric Demarsan, Le Cercle Rouge (Decca, 2000)
 Jack Dieval, Jack Dieval & Paris Jazz Quartet (Concert Hall, 1968)
 Jack Dieval, Pianos Duet (Columbia, 1969)
 Niels Lan Doky, Paris by Night (Soul Note, 1993)
 Les Double Six, Meet Quincy Jones (Columbia, 1960)
 Les Double Six, Les Double Six (Columbia, 1961)
 Art Farmer, What Happens ?... (Campi, 1968)
 Claudio Fasoli, Welcome (Soul Note, 1987)
 David Friedman, Of the Wind's Eye (Enja, 1981)
 David Friedman, Ternaire (Deux Z, 1992)
 Richard Galliano, French Touch (Dreyfus, 1998)
 Richard Galliano, Concerts Inedits (Dreyfus, 1999)
 Jef Gilson, OEil Vision (Club De L'Echiquier 1964)
 Jimmy Gourley, Graffitti (Promophone, 1977)
 Steve Grossman, Born at the Same Time (Owl, 1978)
 Jim Hall, It's Nice to Be with You (MPS 1969)
 Slide Hampton, Mellow-dy (LRC, 1992)
 Roland Hanna, Child of Gemini (MPS/BASF, 1971)
 Michel Hausser & Bobby Jaspar, Vibes + Flute (Columbia, 1960)
 Michel Hausser, Up in Hamburg (Columbia, 1960)
 Hampton Hawes, Piano Improvisation (Joker, 1977)
 Joe Henderson, Black Narcissus (Milestone, 1976)
 Hans Werner Henze, Cembalo Modern + Jazz (Philips, 1964)
 Antoine Herve, Enregistre a L'Usine Ephemere (Sari Seer 1990)
 Andre Hodeir, Anna Livia Plurabelle (Philips, 1966)
 Bobby Jaspar, The Bobby Jaspar Quartet at Ronnie Scott's 1962 (Mole, 1986)
 Bobby Jaspar, Le Jazz Est Un Roman (Owl, 2002)
 Francois Jeanneau, Ephemere (Owl, 1977)
 Francois Jeanneau, Terrains Vagues (Owl, 1983)
 Ivan Jullien, Live at Nancy Jazz Pulsations (Mimetik, 2019)
 Barney Kessel, Reflections in Rome (RCA Victor, 1969)
 Eartha Kitt, Thinking Jazz (ITM, 1991)
 Lee Konitz & Martial Solal, European Episode (Campi, 1969)
 Lee Konitz & Martial Solal, Impressive Rome (Campi, 1969)
 Lee Konitz, Jazz a Juan (SteepleChase, 1977)
 Hilaria Kramer, La Suite Live! (Unit, 2012)
 Karin Krog, Open Space (MPS 1969)
 Joachim Kuhn, This Way Out (MPS/BASF, 1973)
 Joachim Kuhn, Birthday Edition (ACT, 2014)
 Rolf Kuhn, Connection '74 (MPS/BASF, 1974)
 Rolf Kuhn, Total Space (MPS/BASF, 1975)
 Guy Lafitte, Blues (Vega, 1969)
 Christof Lauer, Evidence (CMP, 1995)
 John Lewis, Midnight in Paris (EmArcy, 1988)
 Rolf Liebermann, Les Echanges (EX 1964)
 Didier Lockwood, For Stephane (Ames, 2008)
 Steve Marcus, Green Line (Nivico, 1970)
 Helen Merrill, Just Friends (EmArcy, 1989)
 Jean-Christian Michel, Vol. 6 (General, 1973)
 Jean-Christian Michel, Vision D'Ezechiel (General, 1974)
 Jean-Christian Michel, Lumiere (General, 1980)
 Ray Nance, Huffin 'n' Puffin (MPS/BASF, 1974)
 Bud Powell, Memorial Oscar Pettiford (Vogue, 1960)
 Francois Rabbath, No. 2 (Philips, 1965)
 Francois Rabbath, 60 Emen, Moshe (Naim, 1990)
 Jean-Pierre Rampal, Picnic Suite (CBS, 1980)
 Henri Renaud, Blue Cylinder (PSI, 1970)
 Larry Schneider, So Easy (Label Bleu, 1988)
 Dino Betti van der Noot, Here Comes Springtime (Soul Note, 1985)
 Joe Venuti, Doin' Things (Pausa, 1971)

References

External links
 Official site of Daniel Humair 

1938 births
Living people
Artists from Geneva
Swiss drummers
Swiss jazz composers
Swiss male musicians
Officiers of the Ordre des Arts et des Lettres
Male jazz composers
European Jazz Ensemble members
Label Bleu artists
Musicians from Geneva